Greece competed at the 2018 European Athletics Championships in Berlin, Germany, between 6 and 12 August 2018 with 37 athletes.

Medals

Results

Men
Track & road events

Field Events

Women
Track & road events

Field Events

Key
Q = Qualified for the next round
q = Qualified for the next round as a fastest loser or, in field events, by position without achieving the qualifying target
NR = National record
N/A = Round not applicable for the event
Bye = Athlete not required to compete in round

References

European Athletics Championships
2018
Nations at the 2018 European Athletics Championships